Sir Arthur John Page (16 September 1919 – 31 October 2008), known as Sir John Page, was a British Conservative politician.

The son of Sir Arthur Page, sometime Chief Justice of Burma, Page was educated at Harrow and Magdalene College, Cambridge. He was a sales manager and chairman of the Bethnal Green and east London Housing Association.

Page first stood for Parliament at the 1959 general election in Eton and Slough, but without success. He was elected as member of parliament (MP) for Harrow West at a by-election in 1960, and held the seat until he retired from Parliament at the 1987 general election. In the House of Commons he was chairman of the Conservative Parliamentary Labour Affairs Committee from 1970 to 1974 (secretary 1960–61, vice-chairman 1964–69). He was knighted in 1984.

References

External links 
 

1919 births
2008 deaths
Conservative Party (UK) MPs for English constituencies
Knights Bachelor
Alumni of Magdalene College, Cambridge
People educated at Harrow School
UK MPs 1959–1964
UK MPs 1964–1966
UK MPs 1966–1970
UK MPs 1970–1974
UK MPs 1974
UK MPs 1974–1979
UK MPs 1979–1983
UK MPs 1983–1987
Politicians awarded knighthoods